Phra Ram 9 station is a Bangkok MRT station named after Rama IX on the Chaloem Ratchamongkhon line. It serves Fortune Town and G-Land developments around the road junction of the same name, where Din Daeng, Asok-Din Daeng, Ratchadaphisek and Rama IX roads intersect.

The master plan map of The Mass Rapid Transit Master Plan in Bangkok Metropolitan Region (M-Map) contains a planned station of the planned MRT Grey line with the same station name.

Nearby attractions 

 Central Rama 9
 Fortune town

References

External links 
 Locality map of Rama IX Station
 Central Grand Rama 9

MRT (Bangkok) stations
Railway stations opened in 2004
2004 establishments in Thailand